The Drammen Farmers' Club is a meeting hall built in 1921 by a purely social (rather than religious or political) club to host events for a sparsely populated agricultural community in Drammen Township, Lincoln County, Minnesota, United States. After long service as a local community center, it was listed on the National Register of Historic Places in 1980 and became the town hall for the township.

References

Buildings and structures in Lincoln County, Minnesota
Buildings and structures completed in 1921
National Register of Historic Places in Lincoln County, Minnesota